All In is a 1936 British sports comedy film directed by Marcel Varnel and starring Ralph Lynn, Gina Malo and Garry Marsh. The owner of a racing stables has high hopes of winning The Derby, but fate intervenes. It is also known by the alternative title Tattenham Corner, from the play on which it is based. 

The film was made at Islington Studios by Gainsborough Pictures with sets designed by the art director Alex Vetchinsky. It was based on a play, Tattenham Corner, by Philip Merivale and Brandon Fleming, which takes its name from a sharp bend on Epsom Racecourse, where the Derby is run.

Cast
 Ralph Lynn as Archie Slott 
 Gina Malo as Kay Slott 
 Jack Barty as Tingaling Tom 
 Claude Dampier as Toop 
 Sydney Fairbrother as Genesta Slott 
 Garry Marsh as Lilleywhite 
 Robert Nainby as Eustace Slott 
 O. B. Clarence as Hemingway 
 Gibb McLaughlin as Reverend Cuppleditch 
 Glennis Lorimer as Kitty 
 Fewlass Llewellyn as Dean of Plinge

References

Bibliography
 Cook, Pam. Gainsborough Pictures: Cassell, 1997,
 Low, Rachael. The History of the British Film, 1929-1939. Film Making in 1930s Britain. George Allen & Unwin, 1985.
 Wood, Linda. British Films, 1929-1939. British Film Institute, 1986.

External links
 

1936 films
1930s English-language films
Films directed by Marcel Varnel
British sports comedy films
Films set in England
British films based on plays
British horse racing films
Islington Studios films
British black-and-white films
1930s sports comedy films
1930s British films